Unity is the fourth studio album by Israeli jazz bassist Avishai Cohen, released in 2001.

The album is credited to the International Vamp Band, consisting of Avi Lebovich and Yagil Baras from Israel, Diego Urcola from Argentina, Antonio Sánchez from Mexico, and Yosvany Terry from Cuba. The album is inspired by all four cultures, and it combines jazz, Latin, classical, and worldbeat. Cohen plays piano rather than his usual bass, which is played by Baras, who appeared on Cohen's album Colors in 2000.

Track listing 
All tracks written by Avishai Cohen except where indicated

 "Short Story" – 6:55
 "Vamp" – 7:26
 "Etude" – 7:51
 "Float" – 6:16 
 "Island Man" – 6:14
 "Pause" – 1:10
 "Jazz Condo" – 3:20
 "Song for My Brother" – 4:25
 "A Child Is Born" – 7:15 (Thad Jones)
 "Yagla" – 6:15
 "To the Love" – 5:36

Personnel 
 Avishai Cohen – piano, electric bass, vocals
 Antonio Sánchez – drums, vocals
 Diego Urcola – trumpet, flugelhorn
 Yosvany Terry – alto saxophone, tenor saxophone
 Avi Lebovich – trombone, vocals
 Yagil Baras – upright bass

References

External links
Avishai Cohen's website

Avishai Cohen (bassist) albums
2001 albums